The Institute of the National Housing Fund for Workers (Spanish: Instituto del Fondo Nacional de la Vivienda para los Trabajadores; INFONAVIT) is the Mexican federal institute for worker's housing, founded in 1972, and located at Barranca del Muerto 280, in Mexico City. 

It is the largest mortgage lender in Latin America and the fourth worldwide, with over 12 million mortgages on its books and a new one added every 53 seconds. The reform and expansion of Infonavit led to a transformation of the housing production system in Mexico, whereby more houses are now built by developers and purchased with a mortgage than through a self-build process, and it enabled the growth of several national homebuilding firms such as Casas GEO, Homex and Consorcio Ara.

Infonavit receives 5% of all formal workers salaries and provides a series of housing-related mortgage products. These include a mortgage to buy a new or existing home, a mortgage to remodel a home or a mortgage to build a new home.

Directors-general 
 Jesús Silva-Herzog Flores (1972–1976)
 José Campillo Sainz (1976–1988)
 Emilio Gamboa Patrón (1988–1991)
 Gonzalo Martínez Corbalá (1991 – 1991)
 José Juan de Olloqui y Labastida (1991–1993)
 José Francisco Ruiz Massieu (1993–1994)
 Alfredo Phillips Olmedo (1994 – 1994)
 Arturo Núñez Jiménez (1994–1995)
 Alfredo del Mazo González (1995–1997)
 Óscar Joffre Velázquez (1997–1998)
 Luis de Pablo Serna (1998–2001)
 Víctor Manuel Borrás Setién (2001–2012)
 Alejandro Murat Hinojosa (2012–2015)
 David Penchyna Grub (2015–2018)
 Carlos Martínez Velázquez (2018–present)

References

External links 
 Infonavit's website

Government of Mexico
Mexico City
Public housing